Tele Monte Carlo may refer to:

TMC (TV channel), also known as Télé Monte Carlo, or TMC Monte Carlo, French language Monegasque television station
Telemontecarlo, now defunct Italian television station